2C-CP (2C-cP) is a recreational designer drug from the substituted phenethylamine family, with psychedelic effects. It was first synthesised by Daniel Trachsel and colleagues in 2006. It has a binding affinity (Ki) of 95 nM at the serotonin receptor 5-HT2A and 41 nM at 5-HT2C and is active at a dosage of between 15 and 35 mg with a duration of 3 to 6 hours.

See also 
 2C-IP
 2C-P
 2C-T-15
 2C-V
 2C-YN

References 

Designer drugs
Psychedelic phenethylamines
Serotonin receptor agonists
Methoxy compounds
Cyclopropyl compounds